The 2012 Senior Open Championship was a senior major golf championship and the 26th Senior Open Championship, held on 26–29 July at Turnberry Golf Resort in South Ayrshire, Scotland, United Kingdom. It was the 10th Senior Open Championship played as a senior major championship.

Fred Couples won two strokes ahead of Gary Hallberg. It was Couples's second senior major championship victory.

Venue 

The Ailsa Course at Turnberry, situated 80 kilometres south of Glasgow, Scotland, on headland along the Firth of Clyde, overlooking the Isle of Arran and Ailsa Craig, was initially opened with 13 holes in 1901, designed by Willie Fernie, and later completed to 18 holes. It was redesigned by Mackenzie Ross between 1949 and 1951.

It was the seventh Senior Open Championship played at Turnberry. The course had previously hosted The Open Championship four times; 1977, 1986, 1994 and 2009.

Card of the course
Ailsa Course

Field
The field consisted of 144 competitors; 141 professionals and three amateurs.

18-hole stroke play qualifying rounds were held on Monday, 23 July, on three places in Scotland, for players who were not already exempt. The 28 leading players from the qualifying competitions joined the 116 exempt players for the championship.

76 players made the 36-hole cut, 74 professionals and two amateurs. Chip Lutz finished leading amateur at tied 36th.

Past champions in the field
Six past Senior Open champions participated. Three of them made the 36-hole cut; 2010 champion Bernhard Langer (tied 6th), 2003, 2005 and 2007 champion Tom Watson (tied 10th), 2006 and 2009 champion Loren Roberts (tied 27th). 2008 champion Bruce Vaughan, 2004 champion Pete Oakley and 2002 champion Noboru Sugai did not make the cut.

2011 champion Russ Cochran did not compete to defend his title, due to a back injury. 1988, 1990 and 1997 champion Gary Player withdraw prior to the first round due to a neck injury.

Past winners and runners-up at The Open Championship in the field 
The field included six former winners of The Open Championship. Three of them made the cut; 1989 Open champion Mark Calcavecchia (tied 10th), 1996 Open champion Tom Lehman (tied 10th) and 1975, 1977, 1980, 1982 and 1983 Open champion Tom Watson (tied 10th). 1986 and 1993 Open champion Greg Norman, 1985 Open champion Sandy Lyle and 1969 Open champion Tony Jacklin did not make the cut.

The field also included nine former runners-up at The Open Championship; John Cook (tied 6th), Bernhard Langer (tied 6th), Mark McNulty (tied 18th) Tom Kite (tied 24th), Gordon J. Brand (missed cut), Mike Harwood (missed cut), Costantino Rocca (missed cut). Rodger Davis (missed cut) and Wayne Grady (missed cut).

Final results
Sunday, 29 July 2012

Sources:

References

External links 

 Results on European Tour website

Senior major golf championships
Golf tournaments in Scotland
Senior Open Championship
Senior Open Championship
Senior Open Championship